The 2019 Afif attack occurred in May of that year and was an attempt by the Houthi military power to harm Saudi Arabia's economic interests, specifically the East–West Crude Oil Pipeline. The Houthis flew seven drones in the attack on a pumping station at Afif, which is located in the greater region of Riyadh, 250 miles away from the capital. The targets are 800 kilometers north of the Saudi border with Yemen.

The attack was noted in a report issued by UN Secretary-General António Guterres on 9 June 2020 as part of his Iran arms embargo duties to the UNSC.

References

2019 in international relations
2019 in Saudi Arabia
Drone strikes
Iran–Saudi Arabia proxy conflict
Military operations involving Saudi Arabia
Saudi Aramco
May 2019 events in Saudi Arabia
Yemeni Crisis (2011–present)
Houthi insurgency in Yemen